Rochfort is a surname. Notable people with the surname include:

Alexander Rochfort KCB CMG (1850–1916), British Army officer who became Lieutenant Governor of Jersey
Cecil Boyd-Rochfort CVO (1887–1983), British thoroughbred racehorse trainer, British flat racing Champion Trainer five times
Charles Rochfort Scott (1790–1872), British Army officer who became Lieutenant Governor of Guernsey
George Rochfort, 2nd Earl of Belvedere (1738–1814), an Anglo-Irish peer and politician
George Boyd-Rochfort VC DL (1880–1940), Irish recipient of the Victoria Cross
James Rochfort Maguire (1855–1925), British imperialist and Irish Nationalist politician and MP
Robert Rochfort (1652–1727), attorney-general, judge and speaker of the Irish House of Commons
Simon Rochfort (died 1224), English bishop of Meath in Ireland

See also
HMS Rochfort (1814), 74-gun third rate ship of the line of the Royal Navy, launched on 6 August 1814 at Milford Haven
Rochfort Bridge, Alberta, hamlet in Alberta, Canada within Lac Ste. Anne County
Rochfort Maguire (Died 29 June 1867), Royal Navy officer, Captain of HMS Plover 1852–1853 during the Franklin Search Expedition
Rochefort (disambiguation)